Tradewinds Hotel is a luxury hotel in Ottoville, American Samoa. The hotel has 104 guest rooms, 43 suites and 8 large suites. is served by the Equator restaurant which uses inspiration from local Samoan cooking the cook American, European, Pacific and Asian cuisine.

The hotel hosted the Miss Island Queen Pageant in 2009.

References

External links

Hotels in American Samoa
Hotels established in 2003
Hotel buildings completed in 2003